Nättraby is a locality situated in Karlskrona Municipality, Blekinge County, Sweden with 3,109 inhabitants in 2010. Within the parish  to the west is the hamlet of Bjärby.

This railway was extended north to Eringsboda on 1 July 1905. Another railway was opened from Eringsboda to Älmeboda on 21 December 1910 by a different company. Because the latter was in practice an extension of the one from Nättraby to Eringsboda, it merged along with its owner into the Nättraby–Eringsboda railway the following year.

References 

Populated places in Karlskrona Municipality